Magogong is a rural village in Greater Taung Municipality in the North West Province of South Africa.

References

Populated places in the Greater Taung Local Municipality